Laronxe is a commune in the Meurthe-et-Moselle department in north-eastern France. It is 40 km south east of Nancy.

It is served by the St-Clément-Laronxe train station located in the nearby commune of Saint-Clément.

See also
Communes of the Meurthe-et-Moselle department

References

Communes of Meurthe-et-Moselle